The Archeologist is a 1914 American silent short drama film directed by Henry Otto starring Ed, Winifred Greenwood, and John Steppling.

Cast
 Ed Coxen as Billy Green
 Winifred Greenwood as Mary Devon
 John Steppling as James Devon, her father
 Edith Borella as Mimi
 Charlotte Burton as Edna Lee 
 George Field as Snow Ball

External links

1914 films
1914 drama films
Silent American drama films
American silent short films
American black-and-white films
Films directed by Henry Otto
1914 short films
1910s American films
American drama short films
1910s English-language films